Lord Richard Plantagenet Nevill, CMG, CVO, DL (13 January 1862 – 1 December 1939) was a British courtier who served in the households numerous Australian state governors, as well as the governor-generals of Australia and Canada.

The fifth son of William Nevill, 1st Marquess of Abergavenny, he first went to Australia as private secretary to Thomas Brassey, 1st Earl Brassey, Governor of Victoria, followed by spells as secretary and aide-de-camp to Sir John Madden, Lieutenant-Governor of Victoria, to Hallam Tennyson, 2nd Baron Tennyson, Governor of South Australia, to Henry Northcote, 1st Baron Northcote and the William Ward, 2nd Earl of Dudley as governor-generals of Australia, and as chamberlain to Thomas Denman, 3rd Baron Denman, Governor-General of Australia from 1911 to 1914, and Comptroller of the Household to the Duke of Connaught and Strathearn and the Duke of Devonshire from 1914 to 1921, whilst they were governor-generals of Canada.

In 1933, he was declared bankrupt, having "not been free from moneylenders for forty years"; he discharged his bankruptcy later that year.

References 

Members of the British Royal Household
1939 deaths
Younger sons of marquesses
Companions of the Order of St Michael and St George
Commanders of the Royal Victorian Order
Deputy Lieutenants
Richard